Townley is an unincorporated community in Dunklin County, in the U.S. state of Missouri.

History
A post office called Townley was established in 1905, and remained in operation until 1919. The community was named after one Mr. Townly, a businessperson in the lumber industry.

References

Unincorporated communities in Dunklin County, Missouri
Unincorporated communities in Missouri